Awad Ragheb Deeb (born 19 May 1982) is a retired Jordanian footballer of Palestinian origin. He played as a striker and represented the Jordan national team from 2004 to 2008.

Honors and Participation in International Tournaments

In AFC Asian Cups 
2004 Asian Cup

In WAFF Championships 
2004 WAFF Championship 
2007 WAFF Championship 
2008 WAFF Championship

International goals

References
 Awad Ragheb Transfers to Al-Riffa of Bahrain to Be Out on Loan 
 Awad Ragheb to Hutteen SC of Syria 
 Ragheb Joins Shabab Al-Ordon After Ignoring Al-Wahdat SC 
 (Amman) Officially Includes the Striker Awad Ragheb   
 Ragheb Joins Al-Yarmouk FC

External links 
 
 

1982 births
Living people
Jordanian footballers
Jordan international footballers
Jordanian people of Palestinian descent
Expatriate footballers in Syria
Association football forwards
Sportspeople from Amman
Syrian Premier League players